The ninth season of Friends, an American sitcom created by David Crane and Marta Kauffman, premiered on NBC on September 26, 2002. Friends was produced by Bright/Kauffman/Crane Productions, in association with Warner Bros. Television. The season contains 24 episodes and concluded airing on May 15, 2003.

Reception
Collider picked it as the worst Friends season, as they wrote that it was uneven, and that it creatively began to run out of steam "when there's a subplot in which Joey can't remember if he's already slept with the woman he's dating". They picked "The One with Rachel's Other Sister" as its best episode.

Cast and characters

(In particular, Introduced in season 9 or Only in season 9)

Main cast
 Jennifer Aniston as Rachel Green
 Courteney Cox-Arquette as Monica Geller
 Lisa Kudrow as Phoebe Buffay
 Matt LeBlanc as Joey Tribbiani
 Matthew Perry as Chandler Bing
 David Schwimmer as Ross Geller

Recurring cast
 Paul Rudd as Mike Hannigan
 Hank Azaria as David
 Aisha Tyler as Charlie Wheeler
 Dermot Mulroney as Gavin Mitchell
 Phill Lewis as Steve
 Melissa George as Molly
 James Michael Tyler as Gunther

Guest stars
 Maggie Wheeler as Janice Litman-Goralnik
 Elliott Gould as Jack Geller
 Christina Pickles as Judy Geller
 Christina Applegate as Amy Green
 Freddie Prinze Jr. as Sandy
 Selma Blair as Wendy
 John Stamos as Zack
 Jeff Goldblum as Leonard Hayes
 Cleo King as Nurse Kitty
 Janet Hubert as Ms. McKenna
 Kyle Gass as Lowell the Mugger

Episodes

 denotes a "super-sized" 40-minute episode (with advertisements; actual runtime around 28 minutes).

United States ratings
Season 9 averaged 21.6 million viewers and finished as the second most watched show in the 2002–03 television season.

Notes

References

External links
 
 

09
2002 American television seasons
2003 American television seasons